SFPC can mean:

 School for Poetic Computation
 Security Fundamentals Professional Certification
 Shelby Farms Park Conservancy, see Shelby Farms
 Shannon Foynes Port Company, see Shannon Foynes Port